Image markup is markup language that attaches annotations to image files.  It is a critical technology for many researchers and practitioners, especially in the field of medicine.

The term 'image markup' is also sometimes used to refer to vector graphics formats, such as Scalable Vector Graphics (SVG), or to refer to the syntax used to incorporate images into a hypertext markup document.

Standards and applications 
Several standards and applications exist to attach annotations to image files.  These include:
 Image Markup Tool, which is an extension to the Text Encoding Initiative format,
 Evernote Skitch,
 Annotation and Image Markup (AIM), part of caBIG (cancer Biomedical Informatics Grid), run by the U.S. National Cancer Institute,
 Image Markup Language, University of Washington derived from the Digital Anatomist Frame Format
 Oracle WebCenter Imaging

References 

Markup languages
Computer graphics